The 2002 Big 12 Championship Game was a college football game played on Saturday, December 7, 2002, at Reliant Stadium in Houston. This was the 7th Big 12 Championship Game and determined the 2002 champion of the Big 12 Conference. The game featured the Colorado Buffaloes, champions of the North division, and the Oklahoma Sooners, champions of the South division. Both teams had faced each other earlier in the regular season, with the Sooners defeating the Buffaloes 27–11. Oklahoma would win the rematch 29–7 and gained their second Big 12 title in three years.

Teams

Colorado

Oklahoma

Game summary

Statistics

References

Championship Game
Big 12 Championship Game
Colorado Buffaloes football games
Oklahoma Sooners football games
American football competitions in Houston
December 2002 sports events in the United States
2002 in sports in Texas
2002 in Houston